Aspropotamos may refer to:

Aspropotamos (river), a river in western Greece
Aspropotamos, Evrytania, a municipal unit in Evrytania, Greece
Aspropotamos, Trikala, a municipal unit in the Trikala regional unit, Greece